Kirchberg-Alchenflüh railway station is a railway station in the municipality of Rüdtligen-Alchenflüh, in the Swiss canton of Bern. It is an intermediate stop on the standard gauge Solothurn–Langnau line of BLS AG.

Services 
The following services stop at Kirchberg-Alchenflüh:

References

External links 
 
 

Railway stations in the canton of Bern
BLS railway stations